Self-Titled Long-Playing Debut Album is the first album released by +/-. It was written, performed and recorded almost entirely by former Versus guitarist James Baluyut, with his Versus bandmate Patrick Ramos playing additional  drums on the album. Baluyut used the recording of the album to experiment with techniques such as 5-4 time and sampling. Upon release the album was acclaimed for its fusion of indie-rock song structures with electronica production techniques, and it was compared favourably to work by The Microphones and The Notwist. The track "All I do"  was later featured in the soundtrack for the film Wicker Park.

Track listing
"All I Do" – 2:34
"Crestfallen" – 2:37
"The Queen of Detroit" – 3:52
"Beverley Road" – 3:26
"Manifest Destiny (In General)" – 1:27
"The Declaration of Independence" – 3:10
"Setting Your Head on Fire" – 2:56
"The Industrial Revolution" – 3:38
"Yo Yo Yo (Please Don't Fall in Love)" – 2:46
"I Sleep Forever" – 3:45
"All I Have to Do Is Make You" – 2:18
"Ill Advised" – 2:47
"The Separation of Church and State" – 3:45

Includes a Flash video clip for "A Million Pieces on the Ground."

External links
+/- official discography

References

2002 debut albums
+/- (band) albums